Hans E. Strand (born 20 August 1934 in Modum, died 4 May 2000) was a Norwegian politician for the Conservative Party.

He was elected to the Norwegian Parliament from Buskerud in 1977, and was re-elected on one occasion.

At the local level, he was a member of Modum municipal council from 1975 to1979, 1987 to 1995 and from 1999 until his death.

Outside of politics, Strand graduated with a Master of Forestry degree from the University of California, Berkeley in 1963 and worked in forestry and farming. He was active in the European Movement.

References

1934 births
2000 deaths
Members of the Storting
Buskerud politicians
People from Modum
Conservative Party (Norway) politicians
Norwegian College of Agriculture alumni
University of California, Berkeley alumni
Academic staff of the Norwegian College of Agriculture
20th-century Norwegian politicians